The Church's Ministry Among Jewish People (CMJ) (formerly the London Jews' Society and the London Society for Promoting Christianity Amongst the Jews) is an Anglican missionary society founded in 1809.

History

The society began in the early 19th century, when leading evangelical Anglicans, including members of the influential Clapham Sect such as William Wilberforce, and Charles Simeon, desired to promote Christianity among the Jews. In 1809 they formed the London Society for Promoting Christianity Amongst the Jews. The missionary Joseph Frey is often credited with the instigation of the break with the London Missionary Society. A later missionary was C.W.H. Pauli.

Abbreviated forms such as the London Jews' Society or simply The Jews' Society were adopted for general use.
The original agenda of the society was:

 Declaring the Messiahship of Jesus to the Jew first and also to the non-Jew
 Endeavouring to teach the Church its Jewish roots
 Encouraging the physical restoration of the Jewish people to Eretz Israel - the Land of Israel
 Encouraging the Hebrew Christian/Messianic Jewish movement

The society's work began among the poor Jewish immigrants in the East End of London and soon spread to Europe, South America, Africa and Palestine. In 1811, a five-acre field on the Cambridge Road in Bethnal Green, east London, was leased  as a centre for missionary operations. A school, training college and a church called the Episcopal Jews' Chapel were built here. The complex was named Palestine Place. In 1813, a Hebrew-Christian congregation called Benei Abraham (Children of Abraham) started meeting at the chapel in Palestine Place. This was the first recorded assembly of Jewish believers in Jesus and the forerunner of today's Messianic Jewish congregations.

The London Jews Society was the first such society to work on a global basis. In 1836, two missionaries were sent to Jerusalem: Dr. Albert Gerstmann, a physician, and Melville Bergheim, a pharmacist, who opened a clinic that provided free medical services. By 1844, it had become a 24-bed hospital.

In its heyday, the society had over 250 missionaries. It supported the creation of the post of Anglican Bishop in Jerusalem in 1841, and the first incumbent was one of its workers, Michael Solomon Alexander. The society was active in the establishment of Christ Church, Jerusalem, the oldest Protestant church in the Middle East, completed in 1849.

In 1863, the society purchased property outside the walls of the Old City of Jerusalem. In 1897, they opened a hospital on the site, designed by architect Arthur Beresford Pite. Today, the building houses the Anglican International School Jerusalem, which is operated by the society.

In 1914, the society was described as  

In response to changing attitudes towards outreach and the Jewish people, the society has changed its name several times over the years, first to Church Missions to Jews, then The Church's Mission to the Jews, followed by The Church's Ministry Among the Jews, and finally to the current name of The Church's Ministry Among Jewish People, which was adopted in 1995.

The society's historic archives are stored by the Bodleian Library in Oxford. A history of the society was published in 1991.

Current activities
The organisation is one of the ten official mission agencies of the Church of England. It currently has branches in the United Kingdom, Israel, Ireland, France, the USA, Canada, South Africa, Hong Kong and Australia.

The organisation marked its bicentenary in 2009 with four special church services around the United Kingdom.

Current issues
The missionary focus of CMJ attracts criticism from the Jewish community who regard such activities as highly detrimental to Jewish-Christian relations. For example, Rabbi Shmuel Arkush of Operation Judaism, a Jewish organisation dedicated to opposing missionaries, has called for CMJ to be disbanded.

In 1992, George Carey became the first Archbishop of Canterbury in 150 years to decline to be the Patron of CMJ, a decision that was praised by Jewish leaders and reported as the front-page headline in The Jewish Chronicle. Subsequent reports confirmed that the Archbishop, the most senior figure in the Anglican Church, did not wish to endorse the organisation's missionary work, which he felt was damaging to interfaith relations.

In addition, CMJ has often adopted a Zionist position, and expressed the view that the Jewish people deserved a state in the Holy Land decades before Zionism began as a movement, in accordance with the Restorationism of its founders. It supported the establishment of the state of Israel in 1948 and continues to engage in pro-Israel advocacy. This has drawn criticism from opponents such as Stephen Sizer. A detailed response to Sizer's criticisms was produced by the then General Director of CMJ, Tony Higton.

A further source of tension has been the unusual situation whereby the Anglican Bishop in Jerusalem did not receive jurisdiction over Christ Church, Jerusalem once St. George's Cathedral, Jerusalem was constructed in 1899. Many of the bishops have not shared CMJ's convictions or their desire to take the gospel to the Jewish community, but Christ Church belongs to CMJ, which has always had the status of an independent Anglican society, and consequently the bishops do not have control over the church or its activities.

See also

 Christian Restorationism
 Christian Zionism
 Christian Zionism in the United Kingdom
 Christianity and Judaism
 Christianity in the 19th century
 Evangelism
 Evangelicalism
 Hebrew Christian Movement
 Jewish Christians
 Mission (Christian)
 Percy Charles Edward d'Erf Wheeler

References

Bibliography
 Gidney, W. T., Joseph Wolff, (Biographies of eminent Hebrew Christians), London Society for Promoting Christianity Amongst the Jews, 1903
Perry, Yaron (2003). British Mission to the Jews in Nineteenth-Century Palestine. London: Routledge. 
 Lewis, Donald M. The Origins of Christian Zionism: Lord Shaftesbury and Evangelical Support for a Jewish Homeland, Cambridge University Press, 2009.

External links
 CMJ UK website
 CMJ Israel website
 CMJ Ireland website
 CMJ USA website
 CMJ Canada website
 CMJ South Africa (Messiah's People) website
 CMJ Australia, New Zealand, and India website
 CMJ France website
 CMJ Hong Kong website
 Report on activities of the London Society for Promoting Christianity Among the Jews, 1844
 Bookplate of the library of the London Society for Promoting Christianity Amongst the Jews (Rare Books of the Shimeon Brisman Collection in Jewish Studies, Washington University)

1809 establishments in the United Kingdom
Hebrew Christian movement
Anglican organizations established in the 19th century
Christian Zionism in the United Kingdom
Church of England missionary societies
Clapham Sect
Conversion of Jews to Christianity
Jews and Judaism in the United Kingdom
Late modern history of Jerusalem
Religious organisations based in London
Religious organizations established in 1809